Adineh Qoli (also Romanized as Adīneh Qolī; also known as Ādīneh Qal‘eh) is a village in Gholaman Rural District, Raz and Jargalan District, Bojnord County, North Khorasan Province, Iran. At the 2006 census, its population was 605, in 132 families.

References 

Populated places in Bojnord County